Pedro David Ramírez (born 4 April 2000) is an Argentine professional footballer who plays as a right-back for Deportivo Riestra, on loan from Defensa y Justicia.

Career
Ramírez started out at Deportivo Chacabuco from the age of five, before joining River Plate at the age of seven. Aged twelve, Ramírez headed to Lanús before signing for Defensa y Justicia in 2016; as a midfielder. With the latter, he made the breakthrough into first-team football under Hernán Crespo in 2020; as a right-back. After appearing on the substitute's bench for a Copa de la Liga Profesional match with Colón and Copa Sudamericana ties with Sportivo Luqueño and Vasco da Gama, Ramírez made his senior debut domestically on 29 November 2020 against Central Córdoba; as a starter. In the 2021 season, Ramírez played on loan for Estudiantes de Buenos Aires. In June 2022, he was loaned out to Deportivo Riestra.

Career statistics
.

Notes

References

External links

2000 births
Living people
People from Florencio Varela Partido
Argentine footballers
Association football defenders
Argentine Primera División players
Defensa y Justicia footballers
Estudiantes de Buenos Aires footballers
Deportivo Riestra players
Sportspeople from Buenos Aires Province